Reason Party may refer to:
Reason Party (Australia), a political party in Australia
Reason Party (Poland), a political party in Poland